James P. Crutchfield (born 1955) is an American mathematician and physicist. He received his B.A. summa cum laude in Physics and Mathematics from the University of California, Santa Cruz, in 1979 and his Ph.D. in Physics there in 1983. He is currently a Professor of Physics at the University of California, Davis, where he is Director of the Complexity Sciences Center—a new research and graduate program in complex systems. Prior to this, he was Research Professor at the Santa Fe Institute for many years, where he ran the Dynamics of Learning Group and SFI's Network Dynamics Program. From 1985 to 1997, he was a Research Physicist in the Physics Department at the University of California, Berkeley. He has been a Visiting Research Professor at the Sloan Center for Theoretical Neurobiology, University of California, San Francisco; a Post-doctoral Fellow of the Miller Institute for Basic Research in Science at UCB; a UCB Physics Department IBM Post-Doctoral Fellow in Condensed Matter Physics; a Distinguished Visiting Research Professor of the Beckman Institute at the University of Illinois, Urbana-Champaign; and a Bernard Osher Fellow at the San Francisco Exploratorium.

Research

Over the last three decades, Crutchfield has worked in the areas of nonlinear dynamics, solid-state physics, astrophysics, fluid mechanics, critical phenomena and phase transitions, chaos, and pattern formation. His current research interests center on computational mechanics, the physics of complexity, statistical inference for nonlinear processes, genetic algorithms, evolutionary theory, machine learning, quantum dynamics, and distributed intelligence. He has published over 100 papers in these areas.

In 2022, Crutchfield and his graduate student Kyle Ray described a way to bring the heat production of conventional circuits below the theoretical limit of Landauer's principle by encoding information not as pulses of charge but in the momentum of moving particles.

Life

While a graduate student, Crutchfield and students from the University of California, Santa Cruz (including Doyne Farmer) built a series of computers that were capable of calculating the motion of a moving roulette ball, predicting which numbers could be excluded from the outcome. Equipped with hidden electronic equipment of the early days of "mobile" computing, trials in Las Vegas showed success. However, because of technical limitation and the infamous gambler's ruin, the success was only partial and it was not feasible to use to make large profits. A book written about this project (The Eudaemonic Pie / Newton's Casino: The Bizarre True Story of How a Band of Physicists and Computer Wizards Took on Las Vegas) describes Crutchfield in his early years as "hacker-in-residence": "Crutchfield surfs, snorkels, and backpacks. But what he really cares about in life are computers...".

See also
 Chaos: Making a New Science

References

Melanie Mitchell, Peter Hraber (Santa Fe Institute), James P. Crutchfield (University of California, Berkeley), "Revisiting the Edge of Chaos: Evolving Cellular Automata to Perform Computations", SFI Working Paper, 93-03-014, 

Living people
21st-century American physicists
University of California, Santa Cruz alumni
University of California, Davis faculty
University of California, Berkeley College of Letters and Science faculty
American science writers
1955 births
Santa Fe Institute people
Researchers of artificial life